Mount Douglas or Mount Doug may refer to:

Mountains

Antarctica
 Mount Douglas (Antarctica)

Canada
 Mount Douglas, near Welsford, New Brunswick
 Mount Douglas, Saanich, in Greater Victoria, British Columbia
 Mount Douglas Secondary School, a grade 9-12 public school not far from the mountain
 Mount Howard Douglas, Alberta
 Mount Sir Douglas, on the border of Alberta and British Columbia

United States
 Mount Douglas (Alaska)
 Mount Douglas (Montana)
 Mount David Douglas, Oregon

See also
 Douglas Mountain (disambiguation)
 Douglas Peak, Antarctica
 Douglas Peaks, Antarctica
 Mount Douglass, Antarctica